Muhammad Nadzri bin Haji Erwan (born 16 June 1995) is a Bruneian footballer who plays as a midfielder. He has played for various national youth teams of Brunei since 2009 and has one cap for the Brunei national football team.

At club level, Nadzri played for the league teams of the national youth setup, namely Brunei Youth Team (from 2009 to 2011) and Tabuan Muda (from 2015 to 2016). His contemporaries include Shafie Efenddy, Khairil Shame Suhaimi, Aman Abdul Rahim and Abdul Khair Basri.

Internationally, Nadzri has played for the Young Wasps starting from under-14 level all the way up to under-23 level. He participated in two editions of the Southeast Asian Games, namely the 2015 tournament in Singapore and also in 2017 that was hosted in Malaysia as a late replacement for Hanif Hamir.

Nadzri's first international cap came in a friendly match against Cambodia in a 1–6 loss, where he was a starter in the match.

References

External links

1995 births
Living people
Association football midfielders
Bruneian footballers
Brunei international footballers
Competitors at the 2015 Southeast Asian Games
Competitors at the 2017 Southeast Asian Games
Southeast Asian Games competitors for Brunei